Capshaw, formerly known as Lux, is an unincorporated community in eastern Limestone County, Alabama, United States. It is located at the intersection of Capshaw, Sanderson and NW Dupree Worthey Roads. It is now mostly apart of Huntsville with the southern portion near Highway 72 being part of Madison City.

History
The community was named for  early settlers David and William Capshaw. Citation: Territorial papers of the U.S. Vol VI Mississippi page 106 thru 113. Elks River Petition to the President and Congress by intruders on Chickasaw lands. Signed by 450 males. #318 David Capshaw, #433 William W. Capshaw. Madison County Mississippi Territory (AL), 5 Sep 1810. David Capshaw (1779-1839) raised a large family in the community. A post office under the name Capshaw was first opened in 1918.

References

Unincorporated communities in Alabama
Unincorporated communities in Limestone County, Alabama
Huntsville-Decatur, AL Combined Statistical Area